The Upper Sandusky Reservation was home to many of the Wyandot from 1818–1842.  It was the last Native American reservation in Ohio when it was dissolved, and was also the largest Native American reservation in Ohio, although up until 1817 most of Northwest Ohio had not been ceded to the United States government. The reservation was located at the great bend of the Sandusky River.

References

Former American Indian reservations in Ohio
1818 establishments in Ohio
1842 disestablishments in Ohio
Wyandot
History of Ohio